Shiv Nadar University (SNU) is a private research university located on NH-91 near Dadri in Uttar Pradesh, India. SNU is regarded as Institution of Eminence by the University Grants Commission. It was founded in 2011 as part of a series of initiatives launched by the Shiv Nadar Foundation, a private philanthropic foundation founded by Shiv Nadar, the founder and chairman of HCL.

History 
The University was set up in 2011 across 286 acres. Nikhil Sinha was appointed as the founding Vice-Chancellor of the University before Rupamanjari Ghosh took charge as the second Vice-Chancellor of the university on 1 February 2016. On completion of her second term, she handed over charge to Dr. Ananya Mukherjee on 31 January 2022.

In March 2021, the university signed a Memorandum of Understanding (MoU) with the Ministry of Education, Government of India for granting the Institute of Eminence status. On 8 January 2022, the Uttar Pradesh notified Uttar Pradesh Private Universities (Amendment) Ordinance, 2022 was promulgated, removing the university from the list of private universities, thus paving the way for the official granting of Institution of Eminence Deemed to be University status. In August 2022, it officially got Institution of Eminence Deemed to be University status.

Academic organization 
The University has several disciplinary departments across 4 schools.

Schools 
 School of Engineering 
 School of Humanities and Social Sciences
 School of Management and Entrepreneurship
 School of Natural Sciences
and an Academy of Continuing Education (ACE).

Curriculum approach
All the courses at the university are taught in English. Opportunities for Undergraduate Research (OUR) gives an opportunity to undergraduate students to experience research outside the curriculum.

Rankings

In 2021, the National Institutional Ranking Framework (NIRF) ranked Shiv Nadar University 84th overall in India and 56th among universities.

Admissions 
Applicants are evaluated on quantitative ability, abstract reasoning, and communication ability through a school-specific Scholastic Aptitude Test (SNUSAT). They also take an Academic Proficiency Test (APT) in intended major subject areas.

For admissions into the graduate programs, each department uses its own process to evaluate applicants.

References

External links
 Official website

Shiv Nadar University
Institutes of Eminence
Education in Gautam Buddh Nagar district
Educational institutions established in 2011
2011 establishments in Uttar Pradesh